Cheboygan State Park is a public recreation area covering  on the shores of Lake Huron in Cheboygan County, Michigan, United States. The state park offers views of the Fourteen Foot Shoal Light and the remains of the 1859 Cheboygan Point Light plus a distant view of the Poe Reef Light, some six miles to the northeast.

Park history
The current Cheboygan State Park is the second state park unit bearing this name. From 1921 to 1945, a 15-acre Cheboygan State Park, originally referred to as O'Brien's Grove, existed on East Lincoln Avenue in the City of Cheboygan, now the site of the Cheboygan County Fairgrounds. The State of Michigan deeded the former Cheboygan State Park to the County of Cheboygan in 1945 for fair purposes. Then, in 1956, the Federal Bureau of Recreation identified Lighthouse Point  and the Duncan Bay Beach area as the site of a potential state park as part of a survey of the state's coastline. The future park site was given the initial name of "Poe Reef State Park Site" and two years later, the Michigan DNR constructed the 13-acre Duncan Bay State Forest Campground at the location. Just four years later in 1962, the DNR elevated the entire  site as a new Cheboygan State Park, with the state forest campground becoming the campground for the new state park.

Activities and amenities
The park offers swimming, fishing on Duncan Bay and Little Bill Elliot Creek, a carry-in boat launch, picnicking facilities, campsites, cabins and lodge, metal detecting, and hunting. Park trails ranging in length from one-half mile to one and three-quarters miles are used by hikers, mountain bikers, and cross-country skiers. Trails both skirt Lake Huron and plunge into the more remote interior areas.

References

External links
Cheboygan State Park Michigan Department of Natural Resources
Cheboygan State Park Map Michigan Department of Natural Resources
Cheboygan State Park Protected Planet

State parks of Michigan
Protected areas of Cheboygan County, Michigan
Protected areas established in 1962